Joaquim Amaral (born 17 July 1968) is an East Timorese politician and diplomat, and a member of the Fretilin political party.

He is the incumbent Coordinating Minister of Economic Affairs, serving since June 2020 in the VIII Constitutional Government of East Timor led by Prime Minister Taur Matan Ruak.

Previously, Amaral was East Timorese Ambassador to Thailand, and a Member of the National Parliament of East Timor.

Early life and career
Amaral was born in Viqueque, Portuguese Timor (now East Timor), and has a degree in Agriculture. He has been Secretary-General of the Associação das Arquitetos de Timor-Leste (ART), Director of the Forte Group, and Administrator of Funuman PT Ltd.

Political career
Amaral began his political career at the United Nations Transitional Administration in East Timor (UNTAET), for which he worked from 1999 until 20 May 2002, when East Timor's independence was restored. In 2001, he was elected as a Fretilin candidate to the Constituent Assembly of East Timor, from which the National Parliament emerged in 2002. During the 2001–2007 Parliamentary term, he was a member of the Committee for Infrastructure (Committee G).

At the next Parliamentary elections in 2007, Amaral was not re-elected, but on 21 August 2007, one month after the first session of Parliament, he succeeded one of the Fretilin candidates who had not taken up his or her seat. In Amaral's second legislative period, he was a member of the Committee for Infrastructure and Social Facilities (Committee G).

In November 2015, Amaral was appointed as East Timor's ambassador to Thailand, and also as the Permanent Representative of East Timor to the United Nations Economic and Social Commission for Asia and the Pacific (ESCAP), which is based in Bangkok. He served in those offices until 2020.

Following a change in the governing coalition, and the admission of Fretilin to the VIII Constitutional Government, Amaral was sworn in as Coordinating Minister of Economic Affairs on 24 June 2020. In that capacity, he has been the official in charge of leading the negotiations for East Timor to become a member of the World Trade Organization (WTO). 

Since his appointment as Coordinating Minister, Amaral has also been seeking to diversify East Timor's economy beyond its strong dependence upon oil and gas, by promoting other industries including mining, agriculture, fisheries and tourism.

References

External links 

Ambassadors of East Timor to Thailand
Fretilin politicians
Government ministers of East Timor
Living people
Members of the National Parliament (East Timor)
1968 births
21st-century East Timorese politicians